Blackfire Exploration Ltd. is an exploration and mining company based in Calgary, Alberta, 
Canada. The company holds mineral rights in British Columbia, Canada, and Chiapas, Mexico (through its 100% owned Mexican subsidiary company: Blackfire Exploration Mexico S de RL de CV). Blackfire has Canadian and Mexican mineral properties at various stages of development and is currently focused on projects in both Canada and Chiapas, Mexico:

Blackfire Exploration operated a barite mine in Mexico from 2007 to 2009 selling high-grade barite for oilfield drilling to the Mexican market. Blackfire discovered multiple high grade deposits of vanadium, titanium, barite, gold and antimony while working in Chiapas, Mexico.

Controversy
In 2009, three men with ties to Blackfire (one current and two former employees) were arrested following implication in the murder of Mariano Abarca, an anti-mining activist from Chicomuselo. Only a few days later, Blackfire's mine in Chicomuselo was closed by the State Government authorities due to permitting concerns.

The former mayor of Chicomuselo, Mayor Julio César Velázquez Calderón, has been accused by Blackfire and others of extortion and theft of funds. In 2009, Blackfire reported to the State Government that the mayor misappropriated funds from the town of Chicomuselo, which were in place to repair road damage caused by heavy mining equipment being moved through the town and for the sponsorship of the local town fair. In a statement made in December 2009, Blackfire claimed that "[Mayor Velázquez Calderón] asked us for the amount of 10,000 pesos per month to prevent the Mexican co-operative farm near where we mine from taking up arms." On Friday, December 18, 2009 about 500 people demonstrated against Blackfire in the neighbouring town of Frontera Comalapa. The company was accused by anti-mining groups that the misappropriated funds were a bribe; after a lengthy investigation authorities did not lay any charges.

In January 2012, Horacio Culebros Borrayas explained to journalists that the reason for the shutdown of the mine was because the Governor Juan Sabines Guerrero and the Governors Under Secretary Nemesio Ponce wanted Blackfire's mineral wealth for themselves. Mr. Culebros Borrayas accused Governor Juan Sabines Guerrero and Nemesio Ponce of assassinating Mariano Abarca Roblero to accomplish the goals of driving the Canadian company out of Chiapas and falsely imprisoned Horacio Culebros Borrayas and Walter Leon Montoya. Culebros Borrayas and Leon Montoya at the time where political adversaries to the State Government because they prevented the Governor from violating the State constitution and exposed a massive money laundering operation being undertaken by the State government . <https://web.archive.org/web/20150415032253/http://www.radiobonampak.org/amantes-de-lo-ajeno-sabines-guerrero/> Both Governor Sabines and Nemesio Ponce are accused of looting the state of billions of dollars and terrorising and imprisoning those who opposed them <https://archive.today/20150427204232/http://impacto.mx/revista/sDP/sebasti%C3%A1n-lerdo-de-tejada-con-cuentas-por-pagar-a-sabines>

In February 2013, two former employees of Blackfire, Roblero Ciro Perez and Luis Antonio Flores Villatoro were detained by the State police, interrogated and underwent lie detector testing. Both men were cleared of having any involvement in the murder of Mr. Abarca. These interrogations cleared the names of the last two gentlemen who were falsely accused of the crime. The investigation continues and it remained focused on the former State government officials Nemesio Ponce and the former Governor Juan Sabines Guerrero.

In 2015 the Royal Canadian Mounted Police cleared Blackfire after a multi-year corruption investigation. "In a letter from RCMP Staff Sergeant Les Dolhun, team leader for the K Division Federal Policing South's Financial Integrity Team, based in Calgary, Alberta and dated February 18, 2015 (reference: 2009-479985) to MiningWatch Canada, the Canadian government delivered its response to the case of Blackfire Exploration Ltd. and Blackfire Exploration Mexico S. de R.L. de C.V. with regard to the bribery and corruption in 2008 of then-Mayor of Chicomuselo, Chiapas, Julio César Velázquez Calderón of the PRD party.
 
"Thank you for your referral. We have completed our investigation into this matter. The assessment of the evidence does not support criminal charges and accordingly, we will be concluding our file. Please be advised that the RCMP does not comment on concluded investigations which do not result in criminal charges,"  <https://web.archive.org/web/20150406131720/http://www.miningwatch.ca/news/mexican-network-deplores-conclusion-canadian-investigation-blackfire-chicomuselo-chiapas>

On July 31, 2019, the Canadian government denied that its embassy in Mexico had anything to do with the coverup of the 2009 murder of activist Mariano Abarca, reportedly at the hands of the Blackfire Exploration. Family members vow to continue the struggle. Abarca's son said, "No vamos a tener a nuestro padre de vuelta, pero queremos sentar un precedente. Hay conflictos mineros en muchas zonas de México; también en otros países de América Latina. Es importante mostrar el apoyo que reciben frecuentemente las compañías de las embajadas." ("We are not going to get our father back, but we want to establish a precedent. There are mining conflicts in many areas of Mexico and in other countries in Latin America. It is important to demonstrate the frequent support they get from embassies.")

References

Further reading
Former Mayor of Chicomuselo Could be Arrested at any Time
Corrupt Mayor Fined for Embezzlement
https://web.archive.org/web/20091009030544/http://www.rightsaction.org/articles/mining_chiapas_021409.htm
https://web.archive.org/web/20110713030019/http://www.indmin.com/SearchResults.aspx?Keywords=Blackfire%20Exploration&RequiredFields=PUBLICATION_ID%3A696
http://upsidedownworld.org/main/content/view/2157/1/
http://mexfiles.net/category/provincia/chiapas/
 http://www.otrosmundoschiapas.org/index.php/mineria/99-mariano-abarca/581-la-rema-alerta-mas-amenazas-de-muerte-por-parte-de-blackfire.html

External links
http://www.blackfireexploration.com/ Company homepage

Mining companies of Canada